La Haine (released in the United States as Hate) is a 1995 French crime drama film written, co-edited, and directed by Mathieu Kassovitz. Starring Vincent Cassel, Hubert Koundé and Saïd Taghmaoui, the film chronicles a day and night in the lives of three friends from a poor immigrant neighbourhood in the suburbs of Paris. The title derives from a line spoken by one of them, Hubert: "", "hatred breeds hatred". Kassovitz was awarded the Best Director prize at the 1995 Cannes Film Festival.

Plot
La Haine opens with a montage of news footage of urban riots in a banlieue in the commune of Chanteloup-les-Vignes near Paris. A local man, Abdel Ichaha, is in intensive care having been gravely injured in police custody. In the ensuing riots the local police station is besieged, and a police officer loses his revolver. The film depicts approximately twenty consecutive hours in the lives of three friends of Abdel, all young men from immigrant families, in the aftermath of the riot.

Vinz is a young Jewish man with an aggressive temperament who wishes to avenge Abdel, has a blanket condemnation of all police officers, and secretly reenacts Travis Bickle from Taxi Driver in the bathroom mirror. Hubert is an Afro-French boxer and small-time drug dealer who yearns to leave the banlieue for a better life and refuses to provoke the police, but whose boxing gymnasium was burned down in the riots. Saïd is a young North African Muslim who plays a mediating role between Vinz and Hubert.

The three go through an aimless daily routine, frequently finding themselves under police scrutiny. After the police break a rooftop gathering and the three sit idly on a playground, Vinz reveals to the other two that he has found the .44 Magnum revolver lost in the riot, and plans to use it to kill a police officer if Abdel dies. Although Hubert disapproves, Vinz secretly takes the gun with him. The three go to see Abdel in the hospital, but are turned away by the police. Saïd is arrested after their aggressive refusal to leave. He is later released with the help of a familiar police officer.

Following a disagreement between Vinz and Hubert about their perspectives on policing and violence, the two men part ways. Saïd accompanies Vinz, while Hubert briefly returns to his home. They reunite at another gathering in the banlieue, but the situation quickly turns chaotic when Abdel's brother attempts to kill a police officer in revenge. A confrontation with the police ensues, and the group narrowly escapes after Vinz nearly shoots a riot officer. They take a train to Paris, where their responses to both benign and malicious Parisians cause several situations to escalate to dangerous hostility. In a public restroom, a Gulag survivor tells them of a friend who refused to relieve himself in public near their transport train and subsequently froze to death after failing to re-board in time. The trio are puzzled as to the meaning of the story.

They then go to see Snoopy, an avid cocaine user who owes Saïd money, leading to a violent confrontation as he appears to try to force Vinz to play Russian roulette (the gun is secretly unloaded). They have a run-in with sadistic plainclothes police, who arrest Saïd and Hubert while Vinz flees. The police verbally and physically abuse the duo and lock them up until late night, which results in the three missing the last train from Saint-Lazare station and spending the night on the streets.

After being kicked out of an art gallery and unsuccessfully trying to hotwire a car, the trio stay in a shopping mall and learn from a news broadcast that Abdel is dead. They travel to a rooftop from which they insult skinheads and policemen, before encountering the same group of skinheads who begin to beat Saïd and Hubert savagely. Vinz breaks up the fight at gunpoint and captures one of the skinheads. His plan to execute him is thwarted by his reluctance to go through with the deed, and, cleverly goaded by Hubert, he is forced to confront the fact that his heartless gangster pose does not reflect his true nature. Vinz lets the skinhead flee.

Early in the morning, the trio return home and Vinz turns the gun over to Hubert. Vinz and Saïd encounter a plainclothes officer whom Vinz had insulted earlier whilst with his friends on a local rooftop. The officer grabs and threatens Vinz, taunting him with a loaded gun held to his head. Hubert rushes to their aid, but the officer's gun accidentally goes off, killing Vinz. As Hubert and the officer point their guns at each other and Saïd closes his eyes, a single gunshot is heard, with no indication of who fired or who may have been hit.

This stand-off is underlined by a voice-over of Hubert's slightly modified opening lines ("It's about a society in free fall..."), underlining the fact that, as the lines say, jusqu'ici tout va bien ("so far so good"); all seems to be going relatively well until Vinz is killed, and from there no one knows what will happen, a microcosm of French society's descent through hostility into pointless violence.

Cast

Production
Kassovitz has said that the idea came to him when a young Zairian, Makomé M'Bowolé, was shot in 1993. He was killed at point blank range while in police custody and handcuffed to a radiator. The officer was reported to have been angered by Makome's words, and had been threatening him when the gun went off accidentally. Kassovitz began writing the script on 6 April 1993, the day M'Bowole was shot. He was also inspired by the case of Malik Oussekine, a 22-year-old student protester who died after being badly beaten by the riot police after a mass demonstration in 1986, in which he did not take part. Oussekine's death is also referred to in the opening montage of the film. Mathieu Kassovitz included his own experiences; he took part in riots, he acts in a number of scenes and includes his father Peter in another.

The majority of the filming was done in the Parisian suburb of Chanteloup-les-Vignes. Unstaged footage was used for this film, taken from 1986 to 1996; riots still took place during the time of filming. To actually film in the projects, Kassovitz, the production team and the actors, moved there for three months prior to the shooting as well as during actual filming. Due to the film's controversial subject matter, seven or eight local French councils refused to allow the film crew to film on their territory. Kassovitz was forced to temporarily rename the script Droit de Cité. Some of the actors were not professionals and the film includes many situations that were based on real events.

The music of the film was handled by French hardcore rap group Assassin, whose song "Nique la Police" (translated as "Fuck the Police") was featured in one of the scenes of the film. One of the members of Assassin, Mathias "Rockin' Squat" Crochon, is the brother of Vincent Cassel, who plays Vinz in the film.

The film is dedicated to those who died while it was being made.

Reception
Upon its release, La Haine received widespread critical acclaim and was well received in France and abroad. The film was shown at the 1995 Cannes Film Festival where it enjoyed a standing ovation. Kassovitz was awarded the Best Director prize at the festival. The film opened at number one at the French box office with a gross of 12.5 million Francs for the week. It was number one for four consecutive weeks. The film had a total of 2,042,070 admissions in France where it was the 14th highest-grossing film of the year.

On the review aggregator website Rotten Tomatoes, the film holds an approval rating of 100% based on 33 reviews, with an average rating of 8.2/10. The website's critics consensus reads, "Hard-hitting and breathtakingly effective, La Haine takes an uncompromising look at long-festering social and economic divisions affecting 1990s Paris." Kevin Thomas of the Los Angeles Times called the film "raw, vital and captivating". Wendy Ide of The Times stated that La Haine is "[o]ne of the most blisteringly effective pieces of urban cinema ever made."

After the film was well received upon its release in France, Alain Juppé, who was Prime Minister of France at the time, commissioned a special screening of the film for the cabinet, which ministers were required to attend. A spokesman for the Prime Minister said that, despite resenting some of the anti-police themes present in the film, Juppé found La Haine to be "a beautiful work of cinematographic art that can make us more aware of certain realities."

It was ranked number 32 in Empire magazine's "The 100 Best Films of World Cinema" in 2010.

Accolades
Best Director (1995 Cannes Film Festival) – Mathieu Kassovitz
Best Editing (César Awards) – Mathieu Kassovitz and Scott Stevenson
Best Film (César Awards) – Mathieu Kassovitz
Best Producer (César Awards) – Christophe Rossignon
Best Young Film (European Film Awards) – Mathieu Kassovitz
Best Foreign Language Film (Film Critics Circle of Australia Awards)
Best Director (Lumières Award) – Mathieu Kassovitz
Best Film (Lumières Award) – Mathieu Kassovitz

Home media
La Haine was available on VHS in the United States, but was not released on DVD until The Criterion Collection released a two-disc edition in 2007. Both HD DVD and Blu-ray versions have also been released in Europe, and Criterion released the film on Blu-ray in May 2012. The release includes audio commentary by Kassovitz, an introduction by actress Jodie Foster, "Ten Years of La Haine", a documentary that brings together cast and crew a decade after the film's landmark release, a featurette on the film's banlieue setting, production footage, and deleted and extended scenes, each with an afterword by Kassovitz.

See also

 Les Misérables (2019 film), a film with a similar theme and setting
 List of French-language films
 List of hood films
 Social situation in the French suburbs
 List of films with a 100% rating on Rotten Tomatoes

References

External links
 
 
 
 
La haine and after: Arts, Politics, and the Banlieue – an essay by Ginette Vincendeau at The Criterion Collection

1995 films
1995 crime drama films
1995 independent films
1990s French-language films
Best Film César Award winners
Best Film Lumières Award winners
European Film Awards winners (films)
Films about police misconduct
Films about racism in France
Films directed by Mathieu Kassovitz
Films set in Paris
Films shot in Paris
Films whose director won the Best Director Lumières Award
French black-and-white films
French crime drama films
French independent films
French neo-noir films
Hood films
StudioCanal films
1990s French films